Das Oath is a full-length album by thrashcore band Das Oath, released in 2004 by Dim Mak Records. According to the album's liner notes, it was recorded in Rotterdam in the Netherlands.

Track 3, "Awesome Rape", was featured on the soundtrack to the skateboarding video game Tony Hawk's Underground 2.

Track listing

Personnel
 Mark McCoy
 Jeroen Vrijhoef
 Marcel Wiebenga
 Nate Wilson

References

General sources
 Purchase page at Amazon.co.uk featuring track listing, track lengths and release date
 Album liner notes containing personnel information, recording location and producer

2004 albums
Das Oath albums